Haydn quartets may refer to either

 string quartets by Joseph Haydn, or
 the Haydn Quartets written by Wolfgang Mozart in honour of Joseph Haydn.

Also see the US vocal group The Haydn Quartet, also named in honour of Joseph Haydn, but not generally known for performing either set of works.